The 2011–12 Liga Femenina de Baloncesto was the 49th edition of the Spanish premier women's basketball championship. It took place from 15 October 2011 to April 2011. Fourteen teams took part in the championship, with Caja Rural Tintos de Toro and Jopisa Ciudad de Burgos replacing relegated teams CB Olesa and Extrugasa, this one relegated due to financial problems.

Ros Casares defeated defending champion CB Avenida in the play-off's final to win its fourteenth and final title. Uni Girona and Baloncesto Rivas also qualified for the play-offs. On the other hand, Unión Navarra and CB Puig d'en Valls were relegated. However, Ros Casares was disbanded for financial reasons following the end of the season, and CDB Zaragoza, Joventut Mariana and RC Celta renounced to the category for similar reasons. The Spanish Basketball Federation consequently spared Unión Navarra and shortened the championship to eleven teams for the next season.

Regular season

Championship Playoffs

References

Liga Femenina de Baloncesto seasons
Femenina
Spain
Liga